Wallace Browder "Buck" Sydnor Jr. (September 19, 1921 – September 17, 2003) was an American professional basketball player. He spent one season in the Basketball Association of America (BAA) as a member of the Chicago Stags during the 1946–47 season. He attended Western Kentucky University.

BAA career statistics

Regular season

External links
 

1921 births
2003 deaths
American men's basketball players
Basketball players from Kentucky
Chicago Stags players
Guards (basketball)
Undrafted National Basketball Association players
Western Kentucky Hilltoppers basketball coaches
Western Kentucky Hilltoppers basketball players